The 1964 Pacific Tigers football team represented the University of the Pacific during the 1964 NCAA College Division football season.

Pacific competed as an independent in 1964, and played home games in Pacific Memorial Stadium in Stockton, California. In their first season under head coach Don Campora, the Tigers finished with a record of one win and nine losses (1–9). They were outscored 68 to 304, shut out four times, and failed to score more than a touchdown in seven of their ten games.

Schedule

Notes

References

External links
Game program: Pacific at Washington State – October 10, 1964

Pacific
Pacific Tigers football seasons
Pacific Tigers football